Govt. Sheikh Fazilatunnesa Mujib Mohila College, also called Govt. Sheikh Fazilatunnesa Mujib Women's College, located in Zila Sadar Road, Tangail, is a government financed women's college affiliated with Bangladesh National University. The college emerged as an ideal institution while Tangail was lacking on quality educational institutions in 2000s.

Programmes
This college offers higher secondary and degree programmes as well as post-secondary Honours programmes.

Science Group subjects for Honours Programme
 Physics
 Chemistry
 Biology
 Mathematics
 Geography

Arts Group subjects for Honours Programme
 History
 Civics
 Economics
 Social Science
 Geography
 Islamic Studies

References

Colleges in Tangail District
Colleges affiliated to National University, Bangladesh
Universities and colleges in Tangail District
Educational institutions established in 1999
Tangail City
Organisations based in Tangail
1999 establishments in Bangladesh
Women's universities and colleges in Bangladesh